The Montenegro women's national volleyball team is the national team of Montenegro. It is governed by the Volleyball Federation of Montenegro and takes part in international volleyball competitions.

History

Period 2006–2016
Soon after the Montenegrin independence referendum, Volleyball Federation of Montenegro founded national teams. Women's team started to play in 2008, with the first match against Albania (3:0, friendly game).
Same year, Montenegro played its first games in official competitions – against Georgia in 2009 European Volleyball Championship qualifiers.
During the time, Montenegro played in qualifiers for European championship 2009, 2011, 2013 and 2015. National team participated in qualifiers for 2014 FIVB Volleyball World Championship, too.
In the period from 2006 to 2016, Montenegro didn't qualify for a European Championship or World Championship, but had significant results in 2013 and 2014 qualifiers.
At 2015, Montenegro participated at Games of the Small States of Europe, an event for states with less than million inhabitants. Montenegrin team won the gold medal, with four wins and sets score 12–0.

Period 2016–
On spring 2016, Montenegro women's team for the first time played in 2016 Women's European Volleyball League.<br/ >
At the same time, the team started to play in qualifiers for European Championship 2017. Montenegro made score 2–1 in the first stage of qualifiers and participated on the final stage, but at the end, with the score 2–4, didn't succeed to qualify for their first big tournament.
In spring 2016, Montenegrin women's team played for the first time in European Volleyball League, finishing with score 2–4. Same score they made in European Volleyball League 2017.

Competitive record
Until now, Montenegro never played on any major tournament. They participated in the qualifiers for European Championship (4 times) and World Championship (1 time). Montenegro played in European League, too (1 time). Biggest success of the team was gold medal at the 2015 Games of the Small States of Europe.

World Championship
Montenegro women's national volleyball team participated in the qualifiers for one World Championship (2014), but never played at main competition.

As of June 05, 2017

European Championship
Montenegro women's national volleyball team played six times in the qualifiers for one World Championship (2009, 2011, 2013, 2015, 2017, 2019), but never played at main competition.

As of January 09, 2019

European League
Montenegro women's national volleyball team played twice in the CEV European League.

As of September 30, 2017

Games of the Small States of Europe
Montenegro women's national volleyball team played once on the Games of the Small States of Europe (2015) and won the gold medal.

As of September 22, 2019

Senior team roster
In September 2016, a list of Montenegrin national team for European Championship qualifiers is revealed.
 On the list were next players:

Head coaches
From 2007, national team of Montenegro was led by four different head coaches.

Sources:

Official matches 

Montenengro played its first official match at May 2008. There is a list of official matches of the Montenegro women's national volleyball team.

Opponents 
Below is the list of performances of Montenegro women's national volleyball team against every single opponent.

Last update: September 22, 2019.

See also
 List of official matches of the Montenegro women's national volleyball team
 Volleyball Federation of Montenegro (OSCG)
 Montenegrin women's volley league

References

 
Volleyball in Montenegro
National women's volleyball teams